The 2020 Football Championship of Kirovohrad Oblast was won by Lokomotyv SVT Pomichna.

League table

References

Football
Kirovohrad
Kirovohrad